Flamagra is the sixth studio album by American record producer Flying Lotus (Steven Ellison), released on May 24, 2019 by Warp Records. It is his first album since 2014's You're Dead!. The lead single, the spoken-word "Fire Is Coming" featuring David Lynch, was released along with its video on April 17, 2019. The album also features contributions from Anderson .Paak, George Clinton, Little Dragon, Tierra Whack, Denzel Curry, Shabazz Palaces, Thundercat, Toro y Moi and Solange. A deluxe version of the album with the instrumentals was released on May 29, 2020.

Background
Ellison said that he had gathered different material from the past five years in the process of making the record, and had a "thematic idea" about making an album with a fire concept during that time. He imagined an "eternal flame sitting on a hill", and upon hearing David Lynch talking at a party he was attending, asked him to record the same words for his album, at which point he said the idea for the album became fixed.

The track "Post Requisite" was featured on the soundtrack of Ellison's 2017 feature film Kuso and was accompanied by a music video. Prior to the album's release, the tracks "Fire Is Coming", "Spontaneous", "Takashi", "More" and "Black Balloons Reprise" were released as singles. The latter is a reprise of the song of the same name from Denzel Curry's 2018 album Ta13oo. The opening track "Heroes" is a new version of the previously released song "Heroes Pt. 5".

Critical reception

At Metacritic, which assigns a normalized rating out of 100 to reviews from mainstream publications, Flamagra received an average score of 80, based on 27 reviews.

Year-end rankings

Commercial performance
As of July 2019, the album has moved 10,000 units in United States.

Track listing
Credits adapted from liner notes.

Sample credits
 "Post Requisite" contains a sample of "Everything You Do Is a Balloon" by Boards of Canada.
 "Heroes in a Half Shell" contains audio samples of the Dragon Ball series.
 "Black Balloons Reprise" contains a sample of "Ten Et Tiwa" by Alain Goraguer.

Personnel
Credits adapted from liner notes.

Musicians
 Miguel Atwood-Ferguson – strings 
 Ashley Norelle – backing vocals 
 Taylor Graves – keyboards 
 Ronald Bruner – drums , backing vocals 
 Deantoni Parks – drums 
 Niki Randa – backing vocals 
 Thundercat –  bass 

Technical
 Flying Lotus – mixing
 Daddy Kev – mixing, mastering

Artwork
 Winston Hacking – artwork
 Echelon Color – retouching
 Stephen Serrato – layout
 Guccimaze – typeface design
 Joph (Jeong-woo Jo) – portrait

Charts

References

2019 albums
Flying Lotus albums
Albums produced by Flying Lotus